Dolphin F.C. may refer to:

 Dolphin F.C. (Nigeria), defunct football club based in Port Hartcourt
 Dolphin F.C. (Ireland), defunct football club based in Dublin
 Dolphin RFC, an Irish rugby union club based in Cork

See also
 Dolphins United F.C., a football club in the Philippines
 Frankston Football Club, nicknamed The Dolphins, an Australian rules football club
 Delfín S.C., an Ecuadorian football club
 Dolphin (disambiguation)